Mount Helena is a mountain located at the Queen Reach arm of Jervis Inlet and behind Princess Louisa Inlet. Mount Helena is part of the Pacific Ranges of the Coast Mountains in British Columbia Canada.  The mountain was named during the 1860 survey by  who charted all of the known area and named the mountain after Princess Helena Augusta Victoria "Lenchen" who was the fifth child of Queen Victoria and Prince Albert of England.

References

One-thousanders of British Columbia
Pacific Ranges